The Cornish Griffin Round Barn, also known as the "Keeler Barn", is a historic round barn located near Pleasant Lake in Steuben Township, Steuben County, Indiana.  It was built between 1910 and 1920, and is the only historic round barn in the state with glazed tiles, although many other barns in the state were built with unglazed tile silos.  The two-level barn is topped by a two-pitch gambrel roof and the roof is sheathed in wood shingles.

It was listed on the National Register of Historic Places in 1993.

References

Round barns in Indiana
Barns on the National Register of Historic Places in Indiana
Infrastructure completed in 1915
Buildings and structures in Steuben County, Indiana
National Register of Historic Places in Steuben County, Indiana